Eupithecia robiginascens is a moth in the family Geometridae. It is found from the southern and western Himalaya (Pakistan, Jammu and Kashmir, Nepal, India (Himachal Pradesh, Uttar Pradesh, Sikkim) and Bhutan) to southern China (Sichuan, Yunnan) and northern Myanmar.

References

Moths described in 1926
robiginascens
Moths of Asia